Kinamand ( and ) is a 2005 Danish-Chinese comedy drama film that deals with the Chinese immigrant experience in Denmark and marriages of convenience.

Plot
Keld, a plumber, is bored with his job and life. His wife, Rie, tries to interest him in a vacation or dance classes. When this last-ditch attempt fails, Rie, tired of Keld's apathy, divorces him and asks for DKK 50,000 (US $8,817). Keld continues on his downward spiral, ignoring his customers and closing his business indefinitely. He sells all of his and Rie's furniture and lives in the empty apartment. When his food runs out, he starts eating at a Chinese restaurant across the street every night. A pipe in the restaurant explodes and Keld agrees to fix it, in exchange for his meals. After about a month, the owner of the restaurant, Feng, offers Keld DKK 24,000 (US $4,000) to marry his sister, Ling, so that she can get a visa to Denmark. Keld initially refuses, but when faced with the divorce settlement, he goes back to Feng and asks for DKK 50,000, to which the latter agrees.

After a lavish wedding, Ling moves into Keld's apartment, which has been set up to fool the immigration service. Ling and Keld learn to live with each other, despite their language barrier. Keld freely tells his ex-wife and son that the marriage is purely "pro forma". He is concerned about Ling's health, but Feng assures him she's perfectly fine. Ling's influence gradually lifts Keld out of his apathy.

Rie attempts to reconcile with Keld. When that fails, she threatens to call the cops on Keld and Ling's marriage unless she gets her money immediately. Keld goes to Feng to get the funds, but Feng says the wedding cost too much and he doesn't have the cash. Angry, Keld storms home and has a fight with Ling, despite neither of them being able to understand the other.

Keld goes over to Feng's restaurant looking for Ling. A patron advises Keld that love must be professed. Feng comes through with the money, so Keld pays Rie and crushes any hope of reconciliation between them, as he is in love with Ling. When bringing his lunch, Ling overhears Keld practicing the words "I love you" in Chinese. That evening, washing the dishes as she waits for Keld to get up the nerve to say it, Ling collapses. Keld takes her to the hospital, but it's too late. Feng confesses he knew Ling had a genetic heart defect, the reason why he had wanted her to live in Denmark. Ling is cremated, and Keld flies to China to scatter her ashes in her ancestral river.

Cast and characters
 Bjarne Henriksen as Keld
 Vivian Wu as Ling
 Lin Kun Wu as Feng
 Paw Henriksen as Michael
 Charlotte Fich as Rie
 Chapper Kim as Zhang

Awards
Kinamand won the Award of Ecumenical Jury and the FIPRESCI Prize at the Karlovy Vary International Film Festival.

External links
 

2005 films
2005 comedy films
2005 romantic comedy-drama films
Danish romantic comedy-drama films
Danish-language films
2000s Mandarin-language films
Films directed by Henrik Ruben Genz
Films set in Denmark